Drumcondra Football Club is an Irish association football club based in Drumcondra, Dublin. 

Once one of the most successful clubs in Ireland in the 1940s, 1950s and 1960s, with a strong rivalry with Shamrock Rovers since the 1920s, they fell into obscurity since their financial and organisational troubles began in 1969. After numerous name changes, revivals, mergers, splits and relocations, the club is now an amateur one with a large membership of both senior and youth players.

Currently their senior team play in the Leinster Senior League Senior Division 1A. They also field a team in the league's Major 1B Saturday Division.

History

Foundation 
Drumcondra F.C.'s heritage goes back to the late nineteenth century, using variations of the name Drumcondra A.F.C, and Drumcondra Botanic (when they began to play in 1901 on Botanic Road where Santry RFC used to play). Drumcondra's won the Leinster Junior League in 1899 and the Leinster Junior Shield Winners 1911-12. Early figures in the club's history included former player and club honorary secretary Larry Sheridan (who served as chairman and honorary secretary of the Football Association of Ireland (FAI), as well as honorary secretary of the League of Ireland) and Jack A. Ryder (who served as Secretary of the LFA and the FAI). The club lapse during the great war and was refounded in 1924.

Prominence 
Drumcondra came to national prominence, in 1926–27, while playing in the Leinster Senior League and with a team that included Joe Grace and Johnny Murray, Drums won the inaugural FAI Intermediate Cup. They then completed a cup double by also winning the 1926–27 FAI Cup. In the FAI Intermediate Cup final they defeated Cobh Ramblers while in the FAI Cup final they defeated Brideville. In 1927–28 Drums won the Leinster Senior League and also reached the
1927–28 FAI Cup final.

League of Ireland 
In 1928–29 Drumcondra made their League of Ireland debut and finished a respectable fourth in their first season. However Drums would have to wait until the late 1940s before they won their first league title. Then with a team that included, among others, Benny Henderson, Dessie Glynn, Chris Giles, Kevin Clarke, Kit Lawlor and Tim Coffey, they won two in a row in 1947–48 and 1948–49.

In 1953 Sam Prole, a wealthy man from Dundalk who had made his money from the Great Northern Railway, bought Drumcondra from the Hunter family. Prole introduced pitch-side advertising and in 1953 installed floodlights at Tolka Park. As a result, Drumcondra became the first League of Ireland club to have floodlights.

Rivalry with Shamrock Rovers 
During their time in the League of Ireland Drumcondra enjoyed a strong rivalry with Shamrock Rovers. In 1928–29 when Drums made their League of Ireland debut, their first opponents were Rovers. This first meeting between Drums and Rovers ended in a 1–1 draw. During the 1940s and 1950s large crowds gathered to see the Northside/Southside derby fixtures between the two clubs. During this time Drumcondra played Rovers in four FAI Cup finals in 1946, 1948, 1955 and 1957. The two clubs shared the honours, winning two finals each. In 1946 with a team that featured Con Martin, Robin Lawler, Kevin Clarke and Jimmy Lawlor, Drums won their third FAI Cup final after defeating Rovers 2–1 with goals from Tommy McCormack and Benny Henderson. The rivalry reached its peak during the late 1950s. At the time Drums squad included, among others, Alan Kelly, John O'Neill
and Kit Lawlor. The 1956–57 season saw Rovers win the League of Ireland title, while Drums finished second. The opening game of the League of Ireland season saw the two teams meet at Tolka Park. The venue was packed to capacity with a crowd of 15,000. Rovers defeated Drums 2–0 in the Leinster Senior Cup final and then won the Dublin City Cup final on corners. However Drums defeated Rovers 2–0 in the 1956–57 FAI Cup final, thanks to goals from Bunny Fullam and Willie Coleman, and then 3–0 in the semi-final of the Top Four Cup a week later. A crowd of 20,000 turned up on 26 December 1956 to watch the Leinster Senior Cup final. The FAI Cup final on 28 April 1957 saw an attendance of 30,000 while the Top Four semi-final on 5 May 1957 was watched by 16,845. All three games were played at Dalymount Park. The rivalry continued into the 1957–58 season with Rovers and Drums meeting in the finals of the Leinster Senior Cup, the Top Four Cup, the Dublin City Cup and the LFA President's Cup. Rovers won all four. However Drums did finish the season as League of Ireland champions, finishing two points clear of second placed Rovers. Drums and Rovers games continued to attract large crowds and on occasions this created some issues. On 26 January 1958 the first-ever all ticket League of Ireland game between Drums and Rovers had to be abandoned, after sixty-five minutes, after thousands of ticketless fans forced their way into an already packed Tolka Park. This in turn led to crowd encroachment on the pitch. Rovers were leading 2–1 at the time and the result was allowed to stand. In 1964–65 when Drums won their fifth League of Ireland title they finished one point clear of runners-up Rovers.

Merging with Home Farm 

In the late 1960s Drumcondra went into decline. In both 1969–70 and 1970–71 Drums finished last place in the league. They were also £6,000 in debt. At the end of the 1971–72 season the team was effectively taken over by Home Farm when, after almost twenty years in charge, Sam Prole agreed to sell the club. Drums final league game in their own right was a 1–1 draw with Shelbourne at Tolka Park on 5 April 1972. It was announced by Brendan Menton Snr, Home Farm honorary secretary, that the amateur club had taken over the entire share capital of their professional neighbouring club. During the 1972–73 season the side played as Home Farm-Drumcondra, however within a season the Drumcondra name was dropped and from the start of 1973–74 the side simply became Home Farm. Sam Prole subsequently became involved with Dundalk F.C. and a number of former Drumcondra players including Shay Noonan, Johnny Robinson, Willie Coleman, Ned Halpin and Tommy Rowe joined him at the Oriel Park club.

Revival 
Drumcondra F.C. was reformed in the mid 1970s, not long after the demise of the original club. However, by the early 2000s they had relocated to Santry, playing their home games at Morton Stadium. They reached the third round of the 2004 FAI Cup but lost 5–0 to UCD. Over the years there were a number of amalgamations with local clubs coming under the Drumcondra F.C. banner, the most significant of which was with Drumcondra Athletic a club formed in the early 1990s who went on to also achieve LSL Intermediate status prior to amalgamating with Drumcondra F.C.

Statistics

Season placings 

1928–29 – 4
1929–30 – 7
1930–31 – 11
1931–32 – 9
1932–33 – 10
1933–34 – 7
1934–35 – 9
1935–36 – 9
1936–37 – 6
1937–38 – 12
1938–39 – 8
1939–40 – 6
1940–41 – 6
1941–42 – 9
1942–43 – 3
1943–44 – 6
1944–45 – 4
1945–46 – 2
1946–47 – 2
1947–48 – 1
1948–49 – 1
1949–50 – 2
1950–51 – 3
1951–52 – 6
1952–53 – 2
1953–54 – 3
1954–55 – 6
1955–56 – 8
1956–57 – 2
1957–58 – 1
1958–59 – 5
1959–60 – 9
1960–61 – 1
1961–62 – 7
1962–63 – 3
1963–64 – 8
1964–65 – 1
1965–66 – 7
1966–67 – 8
1967–68 – 7
1968–69 – 9
1969–70 – 14
1970–71 – 14
1971–72 – 12

Records

European record
Drumcondra qualified for European football on five occasions during the late 1950s and early 1960s. They made their home European debut on 1 October 1958 in a European Cup against Atlético Madrid at Dalymount Park. They had already lost the away leg 8–0 and would subsequently lose the home leg 5–1. The highlight of their European adventures came in the 1962–63 Inter-Cities Fairs Cup. Drums became the first League of Ireland side to register an aggregate win in European competition when they knocked out an Odense XI in the first round. In the second round they were beaten 6–0 away by Bayern Munich in the first leg. However, in the return game they earned a 1–0 win with Billy Dixon scoring the winning goal.

Overview

Matches

Home grounds

During their time in the League of Ireland, Drumcondra played their home games at Tolka Park. In more recent seasons they have played at Morton Stadium. They currently play at their new base in Baskin Lane, North County Dublin, which they moved to in advance of the 2019/20 LSL season.

Team colours

Drumcondra's colours are essentially gold/yellow and royal blue. In their later seasons in the League of Ireland ,and certainly during the 1968-69 season , they also played in an All sky blue strip. At various times they wore blue/gold hoops with white shorts before adopting a more modern European style gold with a blue v-neck and blue shorts in 1954.

Notable former players

Dual Ireland internationals
   Tom Davis
   Peter Kavanagh
   Con Martin

Republic of Ireland internationals
Johnny Murray represented Ireland at the 1924 Summer Olympics In 1926, Joe Grace became the first player to represent Ireland while playing for Drumcondra. The club were still playing in the Leinster Senior League at the time. In the 1930s Paddy Byrne, Tommy Donnelly, Freddie Hutchinson and Paddy Meehan also represented Ireland while playing for Drumcondra. After the Second World War, Tim Coffey, Dessie Glynn, Benny Henderson, Alan Kelly and Fran Brennan were added to this list.

  Paddy Andrews
  Fran Brennan
  Paddy Byrne
  Kevin Clarke
  Tim Coffey
  Tommy Donnelly
  Bobby Duffy
  Amby Fogarty
  Bobby Gilbert
  Chris Giles
  Dessie Glynn
  Joe Grace
  Eoin Hand
  Joe Haverty
  Benny Henderson
  Freddie Hutchinson
  Alan Kelly
  Fred Kiernan
  Kit Lawlor
  Robin Lawler
  Maxie McCann
  Paddy Meehan
  Johnny Murray
  Lar O'Byrne
  John O'Neill
  Mick Smyth
  Maurice Swan
  Fran Watters

League of Ireland XI representative
  Mick Cahill
  Olly Lyons
  Eamonn Darcy
  Billy Dixon

Ireland (IFA) internationals
  Tucker Croft
  Billy Millar

Scotland internationals
  Alex Parker
  Gordon Smith

Goalscorers
On three occasions Drumcondra players finished as the League of Ireland Top Scorer.
 Dessie Glynn: 1950–51 – 20
 Dan McCaffrey: 1960–61 – 29

Notable former managers
  Billy Behan
  Christy Giles
  Amby Fogarty

Honours
League of Ireland: 5
1947–48, 1948–49, 1957–58, 1960–61, 1964–65
FAI Cup: 5
 1926–27, 1942–43, 1945–46, 1953–54, 1956–57
League of Ireland Shield: 4
1945–46, 1946–47, 1950–51, 1961–62
LFA President's Cup: 7
1946–47, 1947–48, 1949–50, 1950–51, 1958–59, 1961–62, 1966–67 
Dublin City Cup: 6
1939–40, 1940–41, 1949–50, 1950–51, 1951–52, 1960–61
PJ Casey Cup: 1
1962–63
Leinster Senior League: 4
1927–28, 1928–29, 1945–46, 1951–52
Leinster Senior Cup: 11
1933–34, 1935–36, 1938–39, 1942–43, 1943–44, 1944–45, 1949–50, 1953–54, 1958–59, 1959–60, 1961–62
FAI Intermediate Cup: 2
1926–27, 1946–47
FAI Junior Cup
Winners: 1938–39, 1939–40: 2

References

External links
 Drumcondra FC Official Website

 
Home Farm F.C.
Association football clubs in Dublin (city)
Leinster Senior League (association football) clubs
Former League of Ireland clubs
Drumcondra, Dublin
1924 establishments in Ireland
Association football clubs established in 1924